Occupation of Montenegro may refer to:

 Austro-Hungarian occupation of Montenegro (1916-1918) during the World War I
 Italian occupied territory of Montenegro (1941-1943) during the World War II
 German occupied territory of Montenegro (1943-1944) during the World War II

See also
 Montenegro (disambiguation)
 Occupation (disambiguation)